Turco Municipality is the second municipal section of the Sajama Province in the Oruro Department in Bolivia, and was founded on February 15, 1957. Its seat is Turco, situated 154 km west of Oruro at an altitude of 3,860 m. The municipality covers an area of 3,973 km², not taking into account the area of Laca Laca Canton.

It is bordered to the north by the Curahuara de Carangas Municipality and San Pedro de Totora Province, to the south by the Litoral and Sabaya Provinces, to the west by Chile and to the east by the Carangas Province (Qhurqhi (Corque) and Chuqi Quta (Choquecota) Municipalities).

Geography 
The most important rivers are Sajama, Cosapa, Lauca, K'uwiri and Qullpa Jawira (also named río Turco, Turco River) .

A couple of volcanoes and mountains of the Bolivian Western Mountain Range like Uqi Uqini and the volcanic complex of Kimsa Chata, a group of three mountains named Umurata, Acotango and Capurata in the west of the municipality are making up the natural border of Turco Municipality with Chile. Other mountains are listed below:

Subdivision 
The municipality is divided into four cantons and nine ayllus.

Flora and fauna

Part of Cosapa Canton is situated within Sajama National Park. This park was created to conserve the rare woods of the queñua species Polylepis tarapacana and to protect species of wild flora and fauna like yareta (Azorella compacta), Andean hairy armadillo (Chaetophractus nationi), Darwin's rhea (Pterocnemia pennata), vicuña (Vicugna vicugna), taruca (Hippocamelus antisensis), Andean mountain cat (Felis jacobita) and  cougar or puma (Felis concolor), all of them occurring in the municipality, as well as their habitat.

The region has a rich diversity of native plants which are both useful for the inhabitants and the animals. The most important species are:

The people 
Most of the people in the municipality are of Aymara descent known as Carangas. They are mostly bilingual. According to census 2001 the main languages spoken are Spanish (3,544 speakers) and Aymara (3,259 speakers).

Transport 

The international transit road from Oruro to Chile crosses Turco Municipality leading to Tambo Quemado situated in the Chachacomani Canton in the north-western part of the municipality  at the border between Chile and Bolivia.

See also 
 Ch'ankha Muqu

References

External links 
 Turco Municipality: population data and map (not showing Asunción Laca Laca Canton)

Municipalities of Oruro Department